Lelesz is the Hungarian name for two places, one in Romania and one in Slovakia:

 Lelese Commune, Hunedoara County, Romania
 Leles village, Košice Region, Slovakia